North Poorton is a hamlet and civil parish in Dorset, England, situated in the Dorset unitary authority area about  northeast of Bridport. Dorset County Council estimate the parish had a population of 20 in 2013.

Just to the south is the new church, which is dedicated to St Mary Magdalene and was built in 1861–62 to a design by John Hicks.

References

External links

Hamlets in Dorset